Vicki Psarias is a filmmaker and blogger based in Leeds, Yorkshire, England. She is known as the author of the bestselling book Mumboss (2 editions in the UK) and The Working Mom in the US and Canada (published in 2020). She is also the founder and editor of Honest Mum, an award winning parenting blog. Vicki is a filmmaker, writing and directing short films, Broken and Rifts as well as directing and producing TV documentaries, music videos and adverts. She is developing two feature film ideas and an animation film. She has written a children’s book based on her short animation screenplay.

Psarias has been sourced as a subject matter expert in women's health, parenting, business, food and fashion by The Scotsman, Huffington Post, and more.

Her MA graduation film, Rifts won awards at film festivals worldwide including the European Commissioned Euromedcafe International Short Film Competition while her subsequent short film Broken was also very well received. Vicki worked as a runner, then in development for Redbus (now Lionsgate UK). Post Redbus, she wrote and directed Broken.

From 2004 to 2010, Psarias directed drama, TV documentaries, music videos, and short films. Vicki has won the Channel 4 Talent Award for Best Filmmaker in 2007 and The Square Mile Magazine Worldspreads 30 Under 30 London Talent Awards.

Publication and reception
Mumboss: The Honest Mum's Guide To Surviving and Thriving at Work and at Home was published by Piatkus Publishing. Natasha Courtenay-Smith (author of The Million Dollar Blog) described Mumboss as, ‘If ever there is a person who has shown just how successful you can be online whilst also being an amazing parent it is Vicki. Read, learn and follow. A brilliant book from an inspirational mother.' As per Marie Claire, the book is a ‘a no-nonsense guide to navigating the transition.’

Personal life
Vicki lives with her husband, Peter Broadbent, and three children, Oliver, Alexander and Florence who often appear on TV and online with her.

References

1980 births
Living people
Writers from Leeds
People from Windsor, Berkshire
British women bloggers
Writers of blogs about home and family
English bloggers
English filmmakers